Kjell Scherpen (born 23 January 2000) is a Dutch professional footballer who plays as a goalkeeper for Vitesse, on loan from Brighton & Hove Albion of the Premier League, and the Netherlands under-21 national team.

Club career

FC Emmen
Scherpen began his senior career with FC Emmen in the 2016–17 season.

Ajax
In April 2019 it was announced that he would sign for Ajax in June 2019. His 'signing video' involved him writing the words "Ajax is de mooiste club van Nederland" (Ajax is the most beautiful club in the Netherlands) 1,000 times, given that he had been a childhood supporter of rival club Feyenoord.

Scherpen made his debut for the Ajax senior team on 4 April 2021, as starter Maarten Stekelenburg was injured shortly before kickoff.

Brighton & Hove Albion
He was linked with a loan move to Eredivisie side PEC Zwolle, but on 16 July 2021, Scherpen signed for Premier League club Brighton & Hove Albion on a permanent basis, for an undisclosed fee. He made his debut on 8 January 2022, in a 2–1 (after extra-time) away victory over Championship side West Bromwich Albion in the FA Cup third round.

On 31 January 2022, Scherpen signed for Oostende of Belgian First Division A on loan for the remainder of the season. He moved on loan to Vitesse in August 2022.

International career
He has represented the Netherlands at under-19 and under-21 youth levels. Scherpen was called-up to the senior squad for the first time in June 2022, replacing the injured Tim Krul.

Personal life
When he was 18 years old, his older brother Jorg (20) died after having been in a coma following a sudden cardiac arrest.

Career statistics

Honours
Ajax
 Eredivisie: 2020–21
 KNVB Cup: 2020–21
Johan Cruyff Shield: 2019

References

2000 births
Living people
Footballers from Emmen, Netherlands
Dutch footballers
Netherlands youth international footballers
Association football goalkeepers
VV Emmen players
FC Emmen players
Jong Ajax players
AFC Ajax players
Brighton & Hove Albion F.C. players
K.V. Oostende players
SBV Vitesse players
Eredivisie players
Eerste Divisie players
Belgian Pro League players
Dutch expatriate footballers
Expatriate footballers in England
Expatriate footballers in Belgium
Dutch expatriate sportspeople in England
Dutch expatriate sportspeople in Belgium
Netherlands under-21 international footballers